Georgetown University is a private Jesuit research university in Washington, D.C. that was founded as Georgetown College by Bishop John Carroll of Baltimore in 1789. The president of Georgetown University is its chief executive officer, and from its establishment until the 1960s was also the rector of the university's Jesuit community. The president is elected by and may be removed by the university's board of directors, and is ex officio a member of the board. The president is also one of five members of the university's legal corporation, known as the President and Directors of Georgetown College, which was first chartered by the United States Congress in 1815.

The president is charged with control over the "business affairs and properties" of the university, and appoints the vice presidents and administrators and, with the concurrence of the board, appoints the provost, secretary, and treasurer of the university. The president may remove any officer, vice president, or administrator by his accord, except the provost, secretary, and treasurer, which require the concurrence of the board. If the office is vacant, then the powers of the presidency are exercised by the provost. The president is among the 100 highest-paid university presidents in the United States.

Of the 41 individuals to have held the office, nearly all have been Jesuits. Only one has been a member of another religious order while president: Louis William Valentine DuBourg, who was a Sulpician. Three presidents have gone on to become bishops: DuBourg, Leonard Neale, and Benedict Joseph Fenwick. Every president has been a Catholic priest except one, the current president, John J. DeGioia. Having assumed office on July 1, 2001, DeGioia is the university's longest-serving president.

Presidents

See also 
 History of Georgetown University
 Jesuits in the United States
 List of Georgetown University faculty

References

Citations

Sources

External links

 

Georgetown
Georgetown University presidents